The 31st Flying Training Wing was a training formation of the U.S. Army Air Forces (AAF) during World War II.

The wing's mission was to train personnel of the U.S. Army Air Forces Training Command. Headquartered at Enid Field, Oklahoma, for most of its operational service, it controlled contract pilot schools primarily in the Central United States. There is no lineal connection to the 31st Fighter Wing.

History

Until 1939, the U.S. Army Air Corps provided all flying training with military instructor pilots. Beginning in 1939, it contracted with nine civilian flying schools to provide primary flight training.   Primary training consisted of a three-month course of 65 hours of flying instruction. As the United States prepared to enter World War II by expanding its number of flying squadrons, the number of contract primary schools increased.

According to the contract, the government supplied students with training aircraft, flying clothes, textbooks, and equipment. The Air Corps also put a detachment at each school to supervise training. The schools furnished instructors, training sites and facilities, aircraft maintenance, quarters, and mess halls. From the Air Corps, schools received a flat fee of $1,170 for each graduate and $18 per flying hour for students eliminated from training. The Primary Pilot Training used Boeing PT-17 or Fairchild PT-19 two-seater single-engine training aircraft. Also, the wing controlled specialized schools for Liaison Pilots using the Stinson L-5 Grasshopper, and Women Airforce Service Pilots (WASP) primary training was conducted exclusively at Avenger Field, Sweetwater, Texas.

Following the fall of France in 1940, the Air Corps upped its pilot production goal to 7,000 per year. To meet that goal, the Air Corps increased the capacity of its schools and added more contract primary schools. The vast majority of contract primary pilot training ended in the spring of 1944 as part of the rundown of Army pilot training.  The ones remaining open ended their operations in October 1945.

Lineage
 Established as 31st Flying Training Wing on December 17, 1942
 Activated on January 16, 1943
 Disbanded on December 30, 1945

Assignments
 Army Air Forces Gulf Coast Training (later, AAF Central Flying Training) Command, 16 January 1943 – 30 December 1945

Stations
 Chickasha, Oklahoma, trained 8,000 troops at the Wilson and Bonfis Flying School that opened in October 1941, after the war it became Chickasha Municipal Airport.
 Enid Field, Oklahoma, January 16, 1943
 Fort Worth Field, Texas, May 31–30 December 30, 1945

Training aircraft
CPS Primary Trainers were primarily PT-17 Stearman biplanes and Fairchild PT-19s monoplanes, although a wide variety of other types could be found at the airfields.   The Fairchild PT-19 aircraft also could have the student pilot covered with a hood for "Blind" instrument flying training.

Glider pilot schools used Aeronca TG-5As, Taylorcraft TG-6As, and Piper TG-8As unpowered glider conversions of powered light observation aircraft which had similar characteristics to the military gliders under development.

Contract Pilot Schools

 Arledge Field, Stamford, Texas
 308th Flying Training Detachment
 Operated by: Stamford Flying School and Lou Foote Flying Service and Coleman Flying School
 Opened: August 1941, Closed: August 1944 (PT-17, PT-19)
 Controlled four auxiliary airfields

 Avenger Field, Sweetwater, Texas
 319th Flying Training Detachment
 2563d Army Air Forces Base Unit (Women Air Service Pilots), April 1944
 Operated by: Aviation Enterprises.  Conducted Primary, Basic and Advanced (WASP) training
 Opened: May 1942, Closed: December 1945 (PT-17, PT-19)
 Controlled five auxiliary airfields

 Bruce Field, Ballinger, Texas
 306th Flying Training Detachment
 Operated by: Fred Harmon Flying School
 Opened: October 1941, Closed: October 1944 (PT-19)
 Controlled five auxiliary airfields

 Chickasha Municipal Airport, Chickasha, Oklahoma
 316th Flying Training Detachment
 2549th Army Air Forces Base Unit (Contract Pilot School, Primary), April 1944
 Operated by: Wilson-Bonfils Flying School
 Opened: October 1941, Closed: August 1945 (PT-17, PT-19)
 Controlled four auxiliary airfields

 Cimarron Field, Oklahoma City, Oklahoma
 310th Flying Training Detachment
 Operated by: Oklahoma Air College
 Opened: October 1941, Closed: May 1944 (PT-19)
 Controlled three auxiliary airfields

 South Coleman Airport, Coleman, Texas
 304th Flying Training Detachment
 Operated by: Coleman FLying School, Limited
 Opened: July 1941, Closed: November 1944 (PT-19)
 Controlled four auxiliary airfields

 Corsicana Field, Corsicana, Texas
 301st Flying Training Detachment
 Operated by: Air Activities of Texas
 Opened: April 1941, Closed: November 1944 (PT-19)
 Controlled six auxiliary airfields

 Cuero Municipal Airport, Cuero, Texas
 303d Flying Training Detachment
 Operated by: Brayton Flying Services, Inc.
 Opened: May 1941, Closed: August 1944 (PT-17, PT-19)
 Controlled four auxiliary airfields

 Gibbs Field, Fort Stockton, Texas
 313th Flying Training Detachment
 Operated by: Pacific Air School Limited
 Opened: June 1942, Closed: April 1944 (PT-17, PT-19)
 Controlled two auxiliary airfields

 Garner Field, Uvalde, Texas
 305th Flying Training Detachment
 2566th Army Air Forces Base Unit (Contract Pilot School, Primary), April 1944
 Operated by: Hangar Six, Incorporated
 Opened: October 1941, Closed: July 1945 (PT-13, PT-19)
 Controlled four auxiliary airfields

 Grider Field, Pine Bluff, Arkansas
 312th Flying Training Detachment
 Operated by: Pine Bluff School of Aviation
 Opened: April 1941, Closed: October 1944 (PT-19)
 Controlled five auxiliary airfields

 Harvey Parks Airport, Sikeston, Missouri
 311th Flying Training Detachment
 Operated by: Missouri Institute of Aeronautics
 Opened: January 1941, Closed: November 1944 (PT-18, PT-19)
 Controlled seven auxiliary airfields

 Hatbox Field, Muskogee, Oklahoma
 315th Flying Training Detachment
 Operated by Spartan Aircraft Company and Spartan School of Aeronautics
 Opened: January 1941, Closed: June 1944 (PT-19)
 Controlled three auxiliary airfields

 Hicks Field, Fort Worth, Texas
 307th Flying Training Detachment
 Operated by: Texas Aviation School and W. F. Long Flying School.
 Opened: September 1941, Closed: May 1944 (PT-19)
 Controlled three auxiliary airfields

 Jones Field, Bonham, Texas
 302d Flying Training Detachment
 Operated by: Bonham Aviation School
 Opened: September 1941, Closed: November 1944 (PT-19)
 Controlled four auxiliary airfields

 Miami Municipal Airport, Miami, Oklahoma
 322d Flying Training Detachment
 Operated by: Spartan School of Aeronautics
 Opened: June 1941, Closed: March 1944 (PT-17, PT-19)
 Controlled four auxiliary airfields

 Mustang Field, El Reno, Oklahoma
 320th Flying Training Detachment
 Operated by: Midwest Air School
 Opened: February 1943, Closed: November 1944 (PT-17, PT-19)
 Controlled four auxiliary airfields

 Parks Metropolitan Airport, East St. Louis, Illinois
 309th Flying Training Detachment
 Operated by: Parks Air College
 Opened: June 1939, Closed: August 1943 (PT-13, PT-17, PT-19)
 Controlled one auxiliary airfield

 Ponca City Municipal Airport, Ponca City, Oklahoma
 323d Flying Training Detachment
 Operated by: Darr School of Aeronautics
 Opened: June 1941, Closed: May 1944 (PT-17, PT-19)

 Tulsa Municipal Airport, Tulsa, Oklahoma
 314th Flying Training Detachment
 Operated by: Spartan School of Aeronautics
 Opened: June 1939, Closed: August 1944 (PT-3A, PT-17, PT-19)
 Controlled five auxiliary airfields

 Victory Field, Vernon, Texas
 317th Flying Training Detachment
 Operated by: Hunter Flying Service and Richey Flying Service.
 Opened: December 1941, Closed: August 1944 (PT-19)
 Controlled five auxiliary airfields

Contract Glider Pilot Schools

 Aberdeen Regional Airport, Aberdeen, South Dakota
 26th Glider Training Detachment
 Basic Glider Training School (TG-8A)
 Operated by: Anderson & Brennan Flying Service

 Eberts Field, Lohoke, Arkansas
 15th Glider Training Detachment
 Pre-Glider/Primary Training School (TG-8A)
 Operated by:  Kenneth Starnes Flying Service

 Renner Field, Goodland, Kansas
 22d Glider Training Detachment
 Pre-Glider/Primary Training School (TG-8A)
 Operated by: William A. Ong

 Hale County Airport, Plainview, Texas
 4th Glider Training Detachment
 Basic Glider Training School (TG-4A, TG-5, TG-8A)
 Operated by: Clint Breedlove Aerial Service

 Hartlee Field Airport, Denton, Texas
 17th Glider Training Detachment
 Basic Glider Training School (TG-4A, TG-5, TG-8A)
 Operated by: Harte Flying Service

 Hays Airport, Hays, Kansas
 19th Glider Training Detachment
 Pre-Glider/Primary Training School (TG-8A)
 Operated by: Morey Airplane Company

 Janesville Field, Janesville, Wisconsin
 16th Glider Training Detachment
 Basic Glider Training School (TG-4A, TG-5, TG-8A)
 Operated by: Bonham Aviation School

 Okmulgee Municipal Airport, Okmulgee, Oklahoma
 25th Glider Training Detachment
 Pre-Glider/Primary Training School
 Operated by: Sooner Air Training Corp.

 Pittsburg Airport, Pittsburg, Kansas
 21st Glider Training Detachment
 Pre-Glider Training School (TG-8A)
 Operated by: McFarland Flying Service

 Spencer Municipal Airport, Spencer, Iowa
 23d Glider Training Detachment
 Pre-Glider/Primary Training School(TG-8A)
 Operated by: Hunter Flying Service
 Hunter Flying Service moved from Spencer, Iowa, to Hamilton Airport at Hamilton, Texas, on 20 October 1942.

 Theldor Airfield, Vinita, Oklahoma
 27th Glider Training Detachment
 Pre-Glider/Primary Training School (TG-8A)
 Operated by: Burke Aviation Service

See also 
 Other Training Command Primary Flight Training Wings:
 29th Flying Training Wing (Primary flight training wing for AAF Eastern Flying Training Command)
 36th Flying Training Wing (Primary flight training wing for AAF Western Flying Training Command)
 Other Central Flying Training Command Flight Training Wings:
 32d Flying Training Wing (Basic Flight Training)
 33d Flying Training Wing (Advanced Flight Training, Two Engine)
 34th Flying Training Wing (Bombardier and Specialized Two/Four-Engine Training)
 77th Flying Training Wing (Advanced Flight Training, Single Engine)
 78th Flying Training Wing (Classification/Preflight Unit)
 80th Flying Training Wing (Navigation and Glider)

List of wing commanders
 BG Warren R. Carter, 16 January 1943
 BG T.W. Blackburn, 26 April 1943
 Col Henry W. Door, 10 April 1944
 BG Aubry Hornsby, 22 May 1944
 Col James F. Powell, 15 June 1944
 Col Walter S. Lee, 31 July 1944
 BG Charles T. Myers, c. Nov 1944 (Additional Duty)
 Col Walter S. Lee, 16 December 1944
 BG John F. Egan, 4 January 1945
 Col Hilbert M. Wittkop, 23 Apr–31 Oct 1945
 Unknown through 30 December 1945.

Notes

References

1943 establishments in Oklahoma
1945 disestablishments in Texas
Military units and formations established in 1943
Military units and formations disestablished in 1945
Training wings of the United States Army Air Forces